USS YP-93 was a converted fishing vessel which served as an auxiliary patrol boat in the U.S. Navy during World War II.

History
She was laid down in Seattle, Washington. She was completed in 1937 and named Margaret F. On 14 April 1941, she was acquired by the U.S. Navy, designated as a Yard Patrol Craft (YP), and assigned to the 13th Naval District. She was one of the initial ships assigned to the Ralph C. Parker's Alaskan Sector of the 13th Naval District colloquially known as the "Alaskan Navy".

On 8 May 1946, she was struck from the Naval List, transferred to the United States Maritime Administration, and sold later in the year.

She is not to be confused with similarly designated USS YP-93 (ex-Zumbrota) built in 1914.

References

Auxiliary ships of the United States Navy
Ships built in Seattle
1937 ships
Yard patrol boats of the United States Navy
Ships of the Aleutian Islands campaign